Jafarabad (also Romanized as Ja’farābād and Ja’far Ābād) is a village in Qomrud Rural District, in the Central District of Qom County, Qom Province, Iran. At the 2006 census, its population was 93, in 21 families.

References 

Populated places in Qom Province